Glyn Jones (8 April 1936 – 2022) was an English professional footballer who played as an inside forward in the Football League for Mansfield Town, Rotherham United and Sheffield United. 

Jones died in 2022, at the age of 85.

References

1936 births
2022 deaths
English footballers
Association football forwards
English Football League players
Grantham Town F.C. players
Cheltenham Town F.C. players
Mansfield Town F.C. players
Rotherham United F.C. players
Sheffield United F.C. players
Footballers from Rotherham